was a village located in Chikujō District, Fukuoka Prefecture, Japan.

As of 2003, the village had an estimated population of 4,075 and a density of 83.23 persons per km². The total area was 48.96 km².

On October 11, 2005, Taihei, along with the village of Shin'yoshitomi (also from Chikujō District), was merged to create the town of Kōge.

External links
 Kōge official website 

Dissolved municipalities of Fukuoka Prefecture
Populated places disestablished in 2005
2005 disestablishments in Japan